Baranagar or Baranagore is a city and a municipality of North 24 Parganas district in the Indian state of West Bengal. It is a part of the area covered by Kolkata Metropolitan Development Authority (KMDA). Baranagar is the fifth most densely populated city proper 
in the world.

It is home to the Indian Statistical Institute, an institution of national importance devoted to the research, teaching and application of statistics, natural sciences and social sciences. Baranagore Ramakrishna Mission Ashrama High School is one of the oldest and most renowned schools in Baranagar and North 24 Parganas.

Baranagar is a major industrial centre for the manufacture of agricultural and industrial machinery, chemicals, castor oil, and matches; Baranagar is also home to numerous cotton-processing companies, offset & digital printing companies and book publishers.

Etymology
The word Baranagar derives from the Bengali term Barahanagore (Bengali: বরাহনগর), meaning "City of the Hogs". (বরাহ: hog, নগর: city) 
Streynsham Master who visited the area in 1676 spoke of the hog factory where about 3,000 hogs a year were slaughtered and salted for export.

There are several explanations for the etymology of this name:

 Baranagar or Barahanagar, meaning the "big" (Bara or Barra) and "town or land" (nagar) of the "pig" (baraha).

History 

Baranagar Municipality was established in 1869; it is one of the oldest municipalities in India. The Dutch had homes there in the seventeenth century. Streynsham Master who visited the area in 1676 spoke of the hog factory where about 3,000 hogs a year were slaughtered and salted for export. Later it became the centre for the extensive jute trade, manufacturing gunny bags. A major road (Surya Sen Road) parallel to the Hooghly river connects Baranagar Bazaar with Dakshineswar. In between temples such as Kaancher Mandir (i.e. Glass Temple), Joy Mitra Kali Bari and Pathbari are located.

Portuguese colonist first established their business camp here, which was in existence till 1862. Dutch settlers established their ‘Kuthi’ or office for business. Dutch supremacy ended with the arisen of British power in Bengal. M/s. Colvin Cow II Co. was the pioneer of industrial Baranagar. They founded a Sugar Mill near Alambazar. Later George Henderson founded Borneo Jute Factory at that site. In 1859, the factory was renamed Baranagar Jute Factory and is still in existence. The Baranagar Jute Factory was the
first mechanical Jute Factory in India. During the two World Wars, many engineering factories were set up in Baranagar, and the town became famous as Industrial City. To provide civic amenities, North Suburban Municipality was formed in 1869 consisting of Chitpur and Cossipore (presently under Kolkata M.C.), all mouzas of present Baranagar Municipal Area along with Kamarhati, Ariadaha and Dakshineswar mouzas of present Kamarhati Municipality. In 1881 North Suburban Municipality was divided into two parts, 1) Cossipore- Chitpur Municipality (later amalgamated with Kolkata Municipal area) and 2) Baranagar Municipality. On 01.08.1899, Kamarhati Municipality was formed, parting Kamarhati and Ariadaha Mouzas from Baranagar. In 1949 Dakshineswar Mouza was parted from Baranagar and merged with Kamarhati Municipality. 

In Kuthighat (Baranagar), there is still an old house/lodge of Nigerian merchants.

Notable residents

Spiritual Leaders
 Ramakrishna
 Sitaramdas Omkarnath
 Sarada Devi
 Swami Vivekananda
 Ramakrishnananda
 Swami Brahmananda
 Rani Rashmoni
 Chaitanya Mahaprabhu
 Swami Yogananda
 Swami Premananda
 Swami Niranjanananda
 Swami Shivananda
 Swami Saradananda
 Swami Abhedananda
 Swami Adbhutananda
 Swami Turiyananda
 Swami Advaitananda
 Swami Trigunatitananda
 Swami Subodhananda
 Swami Akhandananda
 Swami Vijnanananda
 Swami Tathagatananda

Academician and Writers
 Rabindranath Tagore
 Manik Bandopadhyay
 Sharadindu Bandyopadhyay
 Sanjib Chattopadhyay
 Bhaskar Chakraborty
 Prasanta Chandra Mahalanobis
 Dwijesh Dutta Majumdar
 Bidyut Baran Chaudhuri
 C. A. Murthy

Sports
 Rajib Bhattacharya
 Atanu Das
 Dola Banerjee
 Rahul Banerjee

Entertainment
 Sisir Bhaduri
 Ganapati Chakraborty
 Jaya Bachchan (née Bhaduri)
 Sabitri Chatterjee
 Rudraprasad Sengupta
 Swatilekha Sengupta
 Sohini Sengupta
 Jeet Gannguli
 Shiboprosad Mukherjee
 Abhishek Chatterjee
 Shaan
Manas Mukherjee
 Sagarika

Others
 Prabhabati Bose (née Dutta) (Mother of Subhas Chandra Bose)
 Tanmoy Bhattacharya
 Sambhu Chandra Mukherjee
 Lieutenant Kanad Bhattacharya
 Sasipada Banerji
 Rajkumari Banerji
 Albion Rajkumar Banerjee

Geography

Location

It has an average elevation of 12 metres (39 feet). It is situated east of the Hooghly River. Baranagar Municipal area lies between Sinthee More and Dunlop.

More particularly to say, the boundary of Baranagar is :- in the east – the Rail line from Sealdah towards Krishnanagar; in the west – the holy river Ganga, in the north – Dakshineshwar and PWD Road and in the south – Cossipore and Sinthee. Dakshineshwar Kali Temple lies just a quarter of a mile from this place. There are many Ganga ghats in Baranagar for example Pramanic ghat, Kuthighat, Kancher mandir or glass temple ghat etc.

96% of the population of Barrackpore subdivision (partly presented in the map alongside, all places marked on the map are linked in the full screen map) lives in urban areas. In 2011, it had a density of population of 10,967 per km2. The subdivision has 16 municipalities and 24 census towns.

Climate

Monsoon season prevails during beginning-June to mid-September. Also retrieving monsoon from mid-October till mid-November

The weather is quite pleasant, the summers and winters are moderate. The level of moisture increases during summers.

Demographics

Population

As per the 2011 Census of India, Baranagar had a total population of 245,213, of which 126,187 (51%) were males and 119,026 (49%) were females. Population below 6 years was 16,825. The total number of literates in Baranagar was 208,779 (91.41% of the population over 6 years), male literates are 110,118 (93.69%) and female literates are 98,661 (89%).

 India census, Baranagar had a population of 250,615. Males constitute 53% of the population and females 47%. Baranagar has an average literacy rate of 82%, higher than the national average of 59.5%; with 55% of the males and 45% of females literate. 8% of the population is under 6 years of age.

Kolkata Urban Agglomeration
The following Municipalities, Census Towns and other locations in Barrackpore subdivision were part of Kolkata Urban Agglomeration in the 2011 census: Kanchrapara (M), Jetia (CT), Halisahar (M), Balibhara (CT), Naihati (M), Bhatpara (M), Kaugachhi (CT), Garshyamnagar (CT), Garulia (M), Ichhapur Defence Estate (CT), North Barrackpur (M), Barrackpur Cantonment (CB), Barrackpore (M), Jafarpur (CT), Ruiya (CT), Titagarh (M), Khardaha (M), Bandipur (CT), Panihati (M), Muragachha (CT) New Barrackpore (M), Chandpur (CT), Talbandha (CT), Patulia (CT), Kamarhati (M), Baranagar (M), South Dumdum (M), North Dumdum (M), Dum Dum (M), Noapara (CT), Babanpur (CT), Teghari (CT), Nanna (OG), Chakla (OG), Srotribati (OG) and Panpur (OG).

Infrastructure
As per the District Census Handbook 2011, Baranagar Municipal city covered an area of 7.12 km2. Amongst the civic amenities it had 160.23 km of roads and both open and closed drains. Amongst the medical facilities It had 55 medicine shops. Amongst the educational facilities it had 49 primary schools, 33 middle schools, 33 secondary schools, many higher secondary schools and 2 non-formal education centres. Amongst the social, recreational and cultural facilities it had 2 cinema/theatres and 2 auditorium/ community halls. It had 20 bank branches.

Economy
Baranagar is also economically enriched for "Baranagar Jute Mill". Hessian, sacking, fabrics, carpets and bags from jute (Corchorus spp) are manufactured in here. It is one of the oldest jute mills. The service sector includes the rest of the economy. Baranagar is also home to numerous cotton-processing companies, offset & digital printers and Purushottam Publishers, an academic book publishing company.

Transport

Railways

Baranagar Road railway station is situated in Baranagar. It is a Kolkata suburban railway station. It is one of the oldest railway station. Sealdah - Dankuni line's trains pass through this station.

Metro railways

Noapara metro station is situated at Noapara in Baranagar. It is Kolkata Metro's largest station.
The extension of Kolkata Metro Line 1 from Dum Dum to Dakshineswar was sanctioned in 2010–11. It was extended up to Noapara in 2013. The subsequent work was held up because of the encroachments on railway land. Baranagar metro station is currently operational. Located adjacent to Baranagar Road railway station this station was inaugurated on 22 February 2021 and commercial run started on the following day.

Road

Barrackpore Trunk Road (part of both SH 1 and SH 2) passes through Baranagar. Belghoria Expressway also passes through Baranagar. Dunlop Crossing is one of the largest crossings near Kolkata which connects Kolkata with Northern suburban areas and Howrah, Hooghly. Another important road is Gopal Lal Tagore Road which is connected to B.T. Road at Sinthee More (via Kashi Nath Dutta Road), at Tobin More (via Baghajatin Road) and also at Dunlop. Gopal Lal Tagore Road is also connected to Dakshineswar via Deshbandhu Road-Surya Sen Road (through Alambazar). Many buses ply along all these roads.

Ferry
 
Transport in water pathway is held by boat, launch and bhutbhuti from Baranagar's Kuthi Ghat to Howrah and Belur of Howrah district, Cossipore and Bagbazar of Kolkata district, Uttarpara of Hooghly district, Dakshineshwar and Ariadaha of North 24 Parganas district on the river Ganges.

Education

University

Baranagar houses the headquarters of the Indian Statistical Institute at Bonhooghly. It is an academic institute of national importance as recognised by a 1959 act of the Indian parliament. Established in 1931, this public university of India is focused on statistics.

Colleges
Colleges of Baranagar are: 
Brahmananda Keshab Chandra College
Prasanta Chandra Mahalanobis Mahavidyalaya
 MSME - Development Institute, Kolkata
 Central Modern College of Education

Schools

Baranagar is also home to many schools providing quality education to the local and neighbourhood people.
Baranagore Ramakrishna Mission Ashrama High School (Senior secondary boys' school)
Ramakrishna Mission Centenary Primary School, Baranagore (Primary boys' school)
Central Modern School
 Bonhooghly High School
Baranagar Vidyamandir
 Rajkumari School for Girls
 Mayapith School
Baranagar Narendranath Vidyamandir
Baranagar Rajkumari Memorial Girls' High School
Khalsa Model Senior Secondary School
Ananda Ashram Sarada Vidyapith
Baranagar Netaji Colony Bharti Girls' Institution
Netaji High School
Baranagar Rameswar H.S. School
Baranagar Victoria School
Ashokegarh Adarsha Vidyalaya
Jyotinagar Bidyashree Niketan
Sinthi R B T Vidyapith
Mata Monmohini Secondary School
Baranagar Mayapith Girls' High School
G D Goenka Public School Dakshineswar (earlier: Delhi Public School North Kolkata)
Calcutta Public School, Bidhan Park
Baranagar Mohan Girls' High School
Alambazar Urdu High School
Jyotinagar Vidyashree Niketan

Health facilities
Following hospitals are located in Baranagar: 
 Baranagar State General Hospital
 Disha Eye Hospital
 National Institute for Locomotor Disability (NILD)
 Baine Hospital
 Baranagar Matri Sadan
 Indian Institute of Psychometry (IIP)
 Eskag Sanjeevani Multispeciality Hospital

Culture 

Baranagar Math near Pramanick ghat is the place where Swami Vivekananda and a few other disciples of Sri Ramakrishna Dev started their spiritual journey that culminated in forming the monastic order later located at Belur Math, the present headquarters of Ramakrishna Mission. Other places worth visiting are Jay Mitra Kalibari, Pramanick Kalibari, and Kouleswar Mandir. Pathbari Mandir is a place where Chaitanya Mahaprabhu, the great religious leader, set his foot on his way to Puri nearly five hundred years ago here. In Baranagar a math has been set up very recently, called Alambazar Math in the heritage building where Swami Vivekananda first put up after coming back from abroad.
The Annapurna Temple and the newly built Omkarnath Temple are also other two attractions of the "Mahamilan Math". Trailanga Swami Math is also here in Baranagar at Vidyayatan Sarani. There is also an old kalibari in Baranagar Bazar and one in Kutighat and Pramanicghat.

Baranagar has a gurdwara named "Dunlop Gurudwara" near Dunlop Bridge, a church named "St. James' Church, Baranagar" near Sinthee More along with many mosques.

Baranagar is famous for Durga Puja. Popular Durga Puja organizations like Netaji Colony Lowland, Bandhudal Sporting club, Noapara Dadabhai Sangha, Karmi Sangha, Kalakar para, Ashokgarh Sarbojanin, Nainan Bandhav Samiti, Mullick Colony, Shibmandir maath- all lie in Baranagar.   In every winter, a circus is organised at 'Sinthi Circus Maidan' named "Ajanta Circus".

Recently in 2019, AlamBazar Shyam Mandir has been inaugurated by then Governor of Bengal Jagdeep Dhankhar.

Sports
Baranagar is the birthplace of famous sportspersons who have participated in Olympic Games e.g., archer Dola Banerjee, Rahul Banerjee, Atanu Das.

Many sport academies and sporting clubs are situated in Baranagar:
 Bandhudal Sporting Club
 Calcutta Archery Club
 Baranagar Archery Club
 Baranagar Sporting Club

Tourist attractions
 
Several educational institutions, religious places, pilgrims, heritage buildings, places of Baranagar are tourist attractions of many people. 
 Baranagore Ramakrishna Mission Ashrama High School
 Indian Statistical Institute
 Baranagar Math
 Alambazar Math
 Kripamayee Kali Temple 
 Pathbari Temple
 Mahamilan Math (Omkarnath Math)
 Dokra Kali Mata Temple
 St. James' Church, Baranagar
 Dunlop Gurudwara
 Glass Temple (Kancher Mandir)
 Kuthi Ghat
 Dutch Kuthi 
 Peneti Bagabari of the Tagore family
Besides these, many people come in Baranagar every year in Durga Puja period, in the time of "Ajanta Circus".

Gallery

Notes

References

External links

 Official website
 Baranagar at Encyclopædia Britannica
 Official website of North 24 Parganas district
Photos
 Photos of Baranagar at Flickr

 
Cities and towns in North 24 Parganas district
Neighbourhoods in Kolkata
Kolkata Metropolitan Area
Populated places established in 1869
1869 establishments in British India
Cities in West Bengal